The 2011 San Marino CEPU Open was a professional tennis tournament played on clay courts. It was the 24th edition of the tournament which was part of the Tretorn SERIE+ of the 2011 ATP Challenger Tour. It took place in City of San Marino, San Marino between 8 and 14 August 2011.

Singles main draw entrants

Seeds

 1 Rankings are as of August 1, 2011.

Other entrants
The following players received wildcards into the singles main draw:
  Alessio di Mauro
  Stefano Galvani
  Thomas Muster
  Matteo Trevisan

The following players received entry as a special exempt into the singles main draw:
  Grégoire Burquier
  Leonardo Mayer

The following players received entry from the qualifying draw:
  Maxime Authom
  Benjamin Balleret
  Daniele Giorgini
  João Sousa

Champions

Singles

 Potito Starace def.  Martin Kližan, 6–1, 3–0, retired

Doubles

 James Cerretani /  Philipp Marx def.  Daniele Bracciali /  Julian Knowle, 6–3, 6–4

External links
Official Website
ITF Search
ATP official site

San Marino CEPU Open
San Marino CEPU Open
Clay court tennis tournaments